Melvin Newbern (born June 11, 1967) is an American former National Basketball Association (NBA) player with the Detroit Pistons.  He played in 33 games in the 1992 season for the team, averaging 3.6 points per game.  Born in Toledo, Ohio, Newbern played collegiately for the Minnesota Golden Gophers.

External links
Career statistics

1967 births
Living people
American men's basketball players
Basketball players from Ohio
Cedar Rapids Silver Bullets players
Detroit Pistons players
Fort Wayne Fury players
Hartford Hellcats players
La Crosse Bobcats players
La Crosse Catbirds players
Minnesota Golden Gophers men's basketball players
Pallacanestro Reggiana players
Quad City Thunder players
Rapid City Thrillers players
Shooting guards
Sioux Falls Skyforce (CBA) players
Sportspeople from Toledo, Ohio
Tulsa Zone players
Undrafted National Basketball Association players
Yakima Sun Kings players
American expatriate basketball people in the Philippines
Philippine Basketball Association imports
TNT Tropang Giga players